Windamere Dam is a minor ungated rock fill with clay core embankment dam with an uncontrolled unlined rock cutting spillway across the Cudgegong River at Cudgegong, upstream of Mudgee in the Central Tablelands of New South Wales, Australia. The dam's purpose includes hydro-power, irrigation, water supply, and conservation. The impounded reservoir is called Lake Windamere.

Location and features
The dam was built by Abignano Pty Ltd on behalf of the New South Wales Department of Land and Water Conservation to supply water for irrigation and potable water for the towns of Mudgee and Gulgong. Windamere Dam operates in conjunction with Burrendong Dam to supply water to the Cudgegong and Macquarie valleys.

The uncontrolled unlined rock cut spillway is capable of discharging .

Geotechnical problems included excessive grout takes in highly fractured rock in the dam foundation. The dam foundations are weathered Devonian conglomerates, sandstones and shales. The spillway is an unlined rock cutting that provided all the rock fill required for the construction of the dam embankment. If a spillway had been built in the weathered sedimentary rocks at the dam site full concrete lining would have been required.

To allow the dam's construction, a 15 kilometre deviation of the Castlereagh Highway opened in December 1982.

Power generation

See also

 Irrigation in Australia
 List of dams and reservoirs in New South Wales

References

External links
 

Dams completed in 1984
Energy infrastructure completed in 1984
Embankment dams
Dams in New South Wales
Hydroelectric power stations in New South Wales
Dams in the Murray River basin
Mid-Western Regional Council
1984 establishments in Australia